Jean-Marie-Alexandre Morice (born 1852 in Loyat) was a French clergyman and bishop for the Roman Catholic Diocese of Les Cayes. He was ordained in 1875. He was appointed bishop in 1893. He died in 1934.

References 

1852 births
1934 deaths
French Roman Catholic bishops
People from Morbihan
Roman Catholic bishops of Les Cayes